Karen Briggs may refer to:

 Karen Briggs (musician) (born 1963), American violinist
 Karen Briggs (judoka) (born 1963), British judoka